Acreúna is a city and municipality in western Goiás state, Brazil.

Location
Acreúna is located in the statistical micro-region of Vale do Rio dos Bois, southwest of the state capital, Goiânia, on BR-060, (Brasília-Acre) which links Goiânia with Rio Verde.  The distance to Goiânia is 153 kilometers via BR-060 / Guapó / Indiara.
Municipal boundaries:
North: Paraúna and Jandaia
South: Turvelândia
East: Edéia and Indiara
West: Montividiu and Santo Antônio da Barra

History
The town appeared in 1964 in the territory of the municipality of Paraúna.  It was created through the initiative of Benedicto Arystogogo de Mello, who had already founded the settlements of  Riverlândia, in Rio Verde, and Vila Brasil, in Santa Helena de Goiás.

Mello negotiated with a large landowner of the region to begin selling the lots.  The lands were on the banks of the Rio Verdão and near the  Brasília – Acre highway, which was under construction at the time.

Origin of the name

The name of the town, Acreúna, comes from a combination of Acre, final destination of the highway which crosses the town, and Una, a tribute to Paraúna, the municipality where it had been located before becoming a separate municipality.

It became a district in 1968 and, thanks to its rapid population growth and economic development, it separated from Paraúna in 1976 to become an independent municipality.

Demographic and Political Data
Population density:  11.85 inhabitants/km2 (2007)
Population density:  12.95 inhabitants/km2 (2010)
Growth rate 2000/2007: 0.20.%
Urban population: 16,424 (2007)
Urban population: 20,279 (2010)
Rural population: 2,129 (2007)
Eligible voters: 14,790
City government in 2005: mayor (João Batista Pereira), vice-mayor (Paulo Rogério Pereira), and 09 councilmembers

The economy
The economy is based on agriculture, with a great production of sugarcane, cotton, corn, and soybeans (see below).  The cattle herd had 99,000 head in 2003.
Industrial units: 36
Retail commercial units: 213
Banking units: Banco do Brasil S.A.- BRADESCO S.A.- Banco Itaú S.A. (August/2007)
GDP (PIB) (R$1,000.00):  229,685 (2005)
GDP per capita (R$1.00):  10,959 (2005)

Vehicles (2007)
automobiles: 1,862
trucks: 317
pickups: 413
motorcycles: 1,001
Source: IBGE

The main agricultural products (2007)
cotton: 2,000 ha. / 5,200 tons (Acreuna produced 55,000 tons in 2001)
sugarcane: 5,700 hectares / 501,600 tons
corn: 10,000 hectares / 60,000 tons
soybeans: 22,000 hectares / 61,600 tons
Source: Sepin

Farm information
Number of farms: 434
Total farm area: 141,236
Planted area: 51,300 ha.
Area of natural pasture: 65,990 ha.
Workers in agriculture: 1,042

Health
Infant mortality rate in 2014: 23.97
Infant mortality rate in 2000: 21.13
Infant mortality rate in 1990: 35.64
Hospitals: 03 with 75 beds (2007)

Education
Literacy rate in 2015: 97.1
Literacy rate in 2000: 83.2
Literacy rate in 1991: 77.1
Schools: 13 with 3,840 students (2015)
Schools: 12 with 6,309 students (2006)
Higher education: none reporting in 2006
Source: IBGE

Municipal Human Development Index:  0.686 (2010)
Municipal Human Development Index:  0.763
State ranking:  50 (out of 242 municipalities)
National ranking:  1,498 (out of 5,507 municipalities)

For the complete list see Frigoletto.com

See also
List of municipalities in Goiás
Microregions of Goiás

References

Frigoletto

External links
Rádio Liberdade FM
Guia Comercial de Acreúna (Acreúna Commercial Guide)

Municipalities in Goiás